Kevin Matthew Manno  is an American television and radio host. He began his career with Q101 in Chicago before moving to New York City to host The Seven on MTV. From 2013 to 2021, he was a co-host of the syndicated morning radio show Valentine In The Morning. In August 2021, Manno relocated to Nashville with his family.

Early life 
Manno attended North Central College in Naperville, Illinois, where his and Gordon Mays' program on the school radio station WONC won a 2004 Silver Dome Award from the Illinois Broadcasters Association. After graduating in 2005, he moved to Chicago to begin his broadcasting career. Manno's brother Ryan Manno is also a broadcast professional at iHeartRadio for the EllenK Morning Show on KOST 103.5.

Career 
Having started at Q101 as an intern in 2002, Manno moved through several jobs at the station before landing on the air in 2005. In 2007 he was paired up with his brother Ryan to create The Manno Program.

In September 2009, Manno signed on for three months to host the afternoon show on Vocalo, a subsidiary of Chicago Public Radio. Late that year, Manno and his brother began working as correspondents on Chicago's music-based television show JBTV.

In September 2010, MTV premiered a daily, 30-minute pop-culture news show, The Seven, hosted by Manno and Julie Alexandria. In February 2011, Alexandria departed. The show was canceled after months on the air.

In October 2012, Lifetime premiered Abby's Ultimate Dance Competition. The show, a spin-off of Dance Moms, features Manno as the host alongside judges Abby Lee Miller, Robin Antin and Richy Jackson. The following April, Manno begin shooting the second season of the show.

Personal life
Manno began dating TV personality Ali Fedotowsky in 2013. They announced their engagement in September 2015. They were married on March 3, 2017. They have daughter Molly on July 6, 2016. and son Riley on May 24, 2018.

References

External links 
 KevinManno.com

North Central College alumni
Living people
American television hosts
American radio personalities
American people of Italian descent
Year of birth missing (living people)